Apatelodes turrialba is a moth in the family Apatelodidae. It is found in Costa Rica.

References

Natural History Museum Lepidoptera generic names catalog

Apatelodidae
Moths described in 1910